De Gaulle à la plage is a 2007 comic book which was created by Jean-Yves Ferri.

Synopsis 

The story presents General de Gaulle in a comical scenario as holidaymaker, somewhere on a Brittany beach, and his many satirical adventures.

Animated series

De Gaulle à la plage was adapted into a Arte animated television series starring Philippe Rolland. The series ran for 32 episdoes.

Season 1

Episode list

Season 2

Episode list

References

2007 comics debuts
Bandes dessinées
French comic strips
Comics set in France
Comics adapted into animated series
Humor comics
Dargaud titles
Brittany in fiction
2020 French television series debuts
2020 French television series endings
2020s French animated television series
Cultural depictions of Charles de Gaulle